Silas Ali Agara (born  January 1, 1973) is a Nigerian politician, sport enthusiast and the current deputy governor of Nasarawa State.
He previously served as the Special Adviser on Sports to the Nasarawa State Governor, and was announced as the running mate to  Umaru Tanko Al-Makura in 2015.

References

1973 births
Living people
People from Nasarawa State
Deputy Governors of Nasarawa State
All Progressives Congress politicians